The I-74 Rivalry (also known as The War on 74) is an annual college basketball rivalry game between Illinois State University and Bradley University. The men's rivalry started in 1905 and the women's rivalry began in 1984. The name refers to the two university's 40 mile proximity and their shared access to Interstate 74, which spans from Davenport Iowa, through central Illinois and central Indiana, and finishing in Cincinnati Ohio.

References

1905 establishments in Illinois
Bradley Braves men's basketball
Illinois State Redbirds men's basketball
College basketball rivalries in the United States